The Pike Street Hill Climb, or Pike Street Hillclimb, is a series of steps and escalators/elevators connecting Seattle's Alaskan Way and Central Waterfront along Elliott Bay to Pike Place Market, in the U.S state of Washington. The Seattle Times has called the climb a "glute-burning short cut".

Features 
A series of cluster lights are installed along the climb.

Businesses along the climb have included the cocktail bar Zig Zag Café, the Mexican restaurant El Puerco Lloron, Procopio Gelateria, and other "chic shops and ethnic restaurants".

See also 

 Yesler Hillclimb

References

External links 

 Pike Street Hill Climb at Downtown Seattle Association

Central Waterfront, Seattle
Downtown Seattle
Pike Place Market
Stairways in the United States